The 2007 ITU Triathlon World Cup was a series of triathlon races organised by the International Triathlon Union (ITU) for elite-level triathletes. There were fifteen races held in fourteen countries, each held over a distance of 1500 m swim, 40 km cycle, 10 km run (an Olympic-distance triathlon). Alongside a prize purse, points were awarded at each race contributing towards the overall World Cup for which an additional prize purse was awarded. The 2007 World Cup was sponsored by BG Group.

Venues, dates and prize purses

Event results

Mooloolaba

Ishigaki

Lisbon

Richards Bay

Madrid

Vancouver

Des Moines

Edmonton

Kitzbuehel

Salford

Tiszaújváros

Beijing

Rhodes

Cancún

Eilat

Overall rankings
At each race of the series points were awarded to the top 20 finishers per the table below. Double points were awarded for results achieved in the ITU Triathlon World Championship race in Hamburg, Germany on 1–2 September.

Men

Women

Medal table

Note: Rank is arranged by total number of medals.

See also
ITU Triathlon World Championships

References

2007
World Cup